Merritt Carmen Wever (born August 11, 1980) is an American actress. She is known for starring as a perennially upbeat young nurse in Nurse Jackie (2009–2015), an intrepid widow in the Netflix period miniseries Godless (2017), and a detective investigating a serial rapist in the Netflix crime mini-series Unbelievable (2019). For Nurse Jackie, she won the Primetime Emmy Award for Outstanding Supporting Actress in a Comedy Series in 2013, for Godless, she won the Primetime Emmy Award for Outstanding Supporting Actress in a Limited Series or Movie in 2018 and for the mini-series Unbelievable, she was nominated the Golden Globe Award for Best Actress – Miniseries or Television Film in 2020.

Wever has also had supporting roles in other television series, including Studio 60 on the Sunset Strip (2006–2007), New Girl (2013), and The Walking Dead (2015–2016). She has also played supporting roles in such films as Michael Clayton (2007), Birdman (2014), and Marriage Story (2019), all of which were nominated for the Academy Award for Best Picture, with Birdman winning.

Early life
Wever was born in Manhattan, New York City, New York. She was conceived via a sperm donor and raised by her mother, Georgia. Her mother is from Texas, and is a feminist and political activist. 

Wever graduated from Fiorello H. LaGuardia High School and Sarah Lawrence College, and she trained in acting in New York.

Career

Wever began her career starring in low budget, independent short and feature films. She has performed in theater productions, including a performance in Brooke Berman's play Smashing, and in Cavedweller with Deidre O'Connell, both off-Broadway. Since she began her career, Wever has performed in numerous feature films, including: Into the Wild, Neal Cassady, Michael Clayton, Series 7: The Contenders, Signs, The Adventures of Sebastian Cole, Bringing Rain, Tiny Furniture and All I Wanna Do, among others.

She has guest-starred on a number of TV shows, including New Girl, The Good Wife, Conviction, Law & Order: Criminal Intent and The Wire. She also starred in Ed Zwick's ill-fated pilot Quarterlife, with Rachel Blanchard, Austin Nichols, and Shiri Appleby. She also had a recurring role on Studio 60 on the Sunset Strip as Suzanne.

Wever is perhaps best known for her role as Zoey Barkow in the series Nurse Jackie, which premiered on Showtime in June 2009. Zoey is described on the official Nurse Jackie website as "an irrepressibly bubbly trauma nurse, who serves as a comic foil to Edie Falco's hard-bitten (and prescription drug-addicted) titular character". Wever received widespread critical acclaim for her role on the show.

Wever was nominated for a Primetime Emmy Award for Outstanding Supporting Actress in a Comedy Series in 2012 and 2013 for her role in Nurse Jackie, winning the award in 2013 and delivering a memorable speech that consisted only of her stunned reaction: "Thanks so much. Thank you so much. I gotta go. Bye."

In 2016, Wever had a recurring role on AMC's The Walking Dead as Denise Cloyd. Her character's death toward the end of the sixth season of the series was controversial and sparked outrage on social media with many fans, most notably members of the LGBT community.

Wever played a lead role in 2017's miniseries Godless as Mary Agnes McNue, a tough leader of a female-dominated town. She said in interviews that she had been intimidated by the role: "I spent so much of this shoot thinking I would come off as a fool, that nobody would buy me as this and it wouldn't be believable." Many critics nonetheless noted her character as a highlight of the show. Entertainment Weekly titled its review of Godless "Merritt Wever rides tall in Netflix's Godless" and wrote that "no one is more electric than the always extraordinary Merritt Wever". In 2018, she won an Emmy for the role.

In 2019, Wever starred in another Netflix miniseries Unbelievable, opposite Toni Collette and Kaitlyn Dever released on September 13, 2019. The series received critical acclaim, with Wever receiving her first Golden Globe Awards nomination for Best Actress- Miniseries or Television Film.

In 2020, Wever began starring in the HBO black comedy thriller series Run opposite Domhnall Gleeson. It was cancelled after one season.

Filmography

Film

Television

Awards and nominations

References

External links

 

1980 births
20th-century American actresses
21st-century American actresses
Actresses from New York City
American child actresses
American film actresses
American television actresses
American stage actresses
Fiorello H. LaGuardia High School alumni
Living people
Outstanding Performance by a Supporting Actress in a Comedy Series Primetime Emmy Award winners
Outstanding Performance by a Supporting Actress in a Miniseries or Movie Primetime Emmy Award winners
Sarah Lawrence College alumni
People from Manhattan